Merauke, also known as the District of Merauke, is a large town and the capital of the South Papua province, Indonesia. It is also the administrative centre of Merauke Regency in South Papua. It is considered the easternmost city in Indonesia. The town was originally called Ermasoe. It is next to the Maro River where the Port of Merauke is located. As of the 2010 census, Merauke had a population of 87,634 which at the 2020 Census had increased to 102,351.

History 
Merauke was established in February 1902 as a military post by the Dutch, to prevent raids by the Marind-anim into neighbouring British New Guinea and the northwest Torres Strait Islands (Boigu, Dauan and Saibai). The Dutch also tried to establish a rice colony there to no avail.

The Cathedral of St. Francis Xavier in Merauke is the seat of the Roman Catholic Archdiocese of Merauke.

Merauke was the site of an Allied air and naval base, Naval Base Merauke, during World War II and there was ground fighting between Australian and Japanese patrols in the area.

In the late 1920s and early 1930s, Merauke was used as a transit point between Java, and the Boven-Digoel internment camp where many Indonesian Communist Party members were being sent. 

The expression "Sabang to Merauke" is used as shorthand for the territorial extent of Indonesia from west to east, for instance in the name of Sabang Merauke Raya Air Charter. For instance, President Suharto stated in 1968 that "independence, sovereignty and territorial integrity from Sabang to Merauke are for the Indonesian people matters of principle".

Climate
Merauke has a tropical savanna climate (Köppen Aw) with moderate to little rainfall from May to November and heavy rainfall from December to April.

Education
Merauke hosts the Musamus Merauke University, a state-run public university. It was founded as an academy in 2001 and officially became university in 2006.

Merauke as the name
Merauke is used for the name of United States navy ship, USS Merauke (ID-2498).

See also
Merauke Five
Mopah Airport

References

 
Regency seats of South Papua